The 2016–17 FC Rubin Kazan season was the 14th successive season that the club played in the Russian Premier League, the highest tier of association football in Russia.

Season Events
Before the season kicked off, Rubin Kazan appointed Javi Gracia as their new manager, replacing Valeriy Chaly. He brought new players to the club including Rifat Zhemaletdinov, Alex Song and Sergio Sánchez. Jako replaced Puma as the club`s kit supplier.

Squad

Out on loan

Youth squad

Transfers

Summer

In:

Out:

Winter

In:

Out:

Competitions

Russian Premier League

Results by round

Matches

League table

Russian Cup

Squad statistics

Appearances and goals

|-
|colspan="14"|Players away from the club on loan:

|-
|colspan="14"|Players who appeared for Rubin Kazan no longer at the club:

|}

Goal Scorers

Disciplinary Record

References

External links
Official Website 

FC Rubin Kazan seasons
Rubin Kazan